Migmatittodden is the southern headland of Phippsøya, one of Sjuøyane, north of Nordaustlandet, Svalbard, Norway.

External links
Norwegian Polar Institute Place Names of Svalbard Database

Headlands of Svalbard